Eucamptognathus parallelus is a species of ground beetle in the subfamily Pterostichinae. It was described by Deuve in 1986.

References

Eucamptognathus
Beetles described in 1986